Antonio Callaway (born January 9, 1997) is an American football wide receiver for the Dallas Cowboys of the National Football League (NFL). He played college football at Florida, and was drafted by the Cleveland Browns in the fourth round of the 2018 NFL Draft.

Early years
Callaway attended Booker T. Washington High School in Miami, Florida.

College career
As a wide receiver at the University of Florida, he made an immediate impact in his true freshman season. He was selected All-American as a return specialist by CBS Sports in 2015. The 2015 Gators got off to an unexpected 6–0 start after entering their first four games unranked in the AP Poll. Their fourth victory was a thrilling 28–27 come-from-behind victory over Tennessee as Will Grier completed a pass on 4th-and-14 to Callaway for a 63-yard touchdown, and Tennessee could not respond as they missed a 55-yard field goal attempt as time expired. Callaway finished the 2015 season as Florida's leading receiver with 35 catches for 678 yards and four touchdowns.

In January 2016, Callaway and quarterback Treon Harris were suspended from the team. Florida head coach Jim McElwain said the suspensions were related to "schoolwork." It was later revealed that the suspensions were related to an accusation of sexual assault. A woman accused Callaway of sexual assault and Harris of attempted sexual assault in December 2015. The woman reported the alleged incident to Florida's student conduct and conflict resolution office, but did not report the incident to either Gainesville police or University of Florida police. The University of Florida suspended both players for violating the school's code of conduct policy. Both players remained suspended until June, when they returned to campus to take classes and work out at the school's facilities. Callaway was found not responsible of sexually assaulting the female student by an independent hearing officer in a Title IX hearing. The ruling was made by attorney Jake Schickel, a former track and field athlete at Florida who has donated money to Florida's football and basketball programs. Schickel cleared Callaway of three violations of Florida's student conduct code, which included endangering another's health or safety, sexual assault and sexual misconduct, and conduct causing physical injury. On December 7, 2017, while suspended, Callaway made the decision that he was going to enter the 2018 NFL Draft.

Collegiate statistics

Professional career

Cleveland Browns
The Cleveland Browns selected Callaway in the fourth round (105th overall) of the 2018 NFL Draft. The Cleveland Browns traded their fourth (114th overall) and sixth round picks (178th overall) to the New England Patriots and received the Patriots' fourth round pick (105th overall) in exchange in order to draft Callaway. Callaway was the 12th wide receiver drafted in 2018.

2018 season
On May 21, 2018, the Cleveland Browns signed Callaway to a four-year, $3.17 million contract that includes a signing bonus of $717,853.

Callaway began training camp competing against Jeff Janis, Ricardo Louis, and Rashard Higgins for the job as the fourth wide receiver on the Browns' depth chart. Callaway and Rashard Higgins became contenders for a starting wide receiver position after Corey Coleman was granted a trade request on August 5, 2018. Head coach Hue Jackson named Callaway the third wide receiver on the depth chart to start the regular season, behind Jarvis Landry and Josh Gordon.

He made his professional regular season debut in the Cleveland Browns' season-opener against the Pittsburgh Steelers and returned a kick for an eight-yard gain during their 21–21 tie. On September 16, 2018, Callaway earned his first career start and replaced Josh Gordon due to a hamstring injury. He recorded three receptions for 81-yards and scored his first career touchdown during a 21–18 loss at the New Orleans Saints in Week 2. Callaway caught his first career touchdown reception on a 47-yard pass by Browns' quarterback Tyrod Taylor during the fourth quarter. The following day, head coach Hue Jackson named Callaway the starting wide receiver after the Browns traded Josh Gordon to the New England Patriots. In Week 8, Callaway made a season-high five receptions for 36-yards and caught a one-yard touchdown pass thrown by Baker Mayfield as the Browns lost 33–18 at the Pittsburgh Steelers.

2019 season
On August 9, 2019, Callaway was suspended for the first four games of the 2019 season for violating the NFL's substance abuse policy. He was reinstated from suspension on September 30, and was activated prior to Week 5. On November 14, the Browns waived Callaway after showing up late to meetings and practices. He was also facing a 10-game suspension at the time of his release. He lost his appeal on November 15, and was suspended for the final seven weeks of the 2019 regular season and the first three weeks of the 2020 regular season.

Tampa Bay Vipers
Callaway was signed by the Tampa Bay Vipers of the XFL on January 16, 2020. He suffered a lower leg injury in practice on January 29, and was placed on injured reserve on January 30. He had his contract terminated when the league suspended operations on April 10, 2020.

Miami Dolphins
On September 7, 2020, Callaway was signed to the Miami Dolphins practice squad, while still serving a three-game suspension. He was suspended an additional four games by the NFL on September 18. He was reinstated from suspension on November 2, and the team activated him back to the practice squad. He was elevated to the active roster on November 14 for the team's week 10 game against the Los Angeles Chargers, and reverted to the practice squad after the game. Callaway was promoted to the active roster on November 18, 2020. The Dolphins waived Callaway on December 21, 2020.

Kansas City Chiefs
On January 13, 2021, Callaway signed a reserve/futures contract with the Kansas City Chiefs. He was waived with an injury designation on August 17. After going unclaimed on waivers, he was put on the Chiefs' injured reserve. He was released on August 26 after reaching an injury settlement with the Chiefs.

Dallas Cowboys
On November 11, 2022, the Dallas Cowboys hosted Callaway for a workout. He was signed to the team’s practice squad four days later. He signed a reserve/future contract on January 25, 2023.

NFL career statistics

Legal issues
On August 5, 2018, Callaway was issued a citation in Strongsville, Ohio for possession of marijuana and driving with a suspended license during a traffic stop at 3am. The drug charges were dropped, and Callaway paid $911 for the license violation.

See also
2015 College Football All-America Team

References

External links
 Cleveland Browns bio
 Florida Gators bio
 

1997 births
Living people
Booker T. Washington Senior High School (Miami, Florida) alumni
Players of American football from Miami
American football wide receivers
American football return specialists
Florida Gators football players
All-American college football players
Cleveland Browns players
Tampa Bay Vipers players
Miami Dolphins players
Kansas City Chiefs players
Dallas Cowboys players